This is a family tree of the Branković dynasty, which ruled the Serbian Despotate from 1427 to 1459, and descendants of members of the Branković family until the 16th century.

|-
|style="text-align: left;"|Notes:

 The boxes with a blue border represent members of the Branković family. The tilde (~) means "approximately".

References

Family trees
Branković dynasty